David Owusu-Akyeaw (born 27 October 1998) is an English footballer who played as a forward for Gibraltar National League side Glacis United.

Playing career
Owusu joined EFL League One side Rochdale after impressing on trial in October 2016. He signed his first contract at the club three months later. He made his first team debut after coming on as a half-time substitute in a 4–0 defeat to Oxford United at Spotland on 21 January 2017. He was released a few months later due to injury.
After spells at Merstham and Lordswood, Owuso moved to Gibraltar in 2021 to sign for Manchester 62. He made his debut on 16 October, registering an assist in a 2–0 victory over College 1975.

References

1998 births
Living people
English footballers
Association football midfielders
Merstham F.C. players
Rochdale A.F.C. players
English Football League players
Manchester 62 F.C. players
Croydon F.C. players
Whyteleafe F.C. players
Lordswood F.C. players
Glacis United F.C. players
Gibraltar National League players